The 3rd Writers Guild of America Awards honored the best film writers of 1950. Winners were announced in 1951.

Winners & Nominees

Film
Winners are listed first highlighted in boldface.

References

External links
WGA.org

1950
W
1950 in American cinema